Al-adab al-mufrad is a topical book of hadiths collected by Muhammad al-Bukhari addressing the question of perfecting Muslim manners.

Description 
The book has hadith about the manners of Islamic prophet Muhammad. It has 1,322 hadiths. This book is overshadowed by Imam al-Bukhari's other book, the classic collection of hadiths, al-Jami' al-Sahih.

Although al-Adab al-Mufrad was also a significant work of his, Imam al-Bukhari did not make it a requirement that the hadiths within al-Adab al-Mufrad meet the very strict and stringent conditions of authenticity which he laid down for his al-Jami' al-Sahih.  However, based on the writings of later scholars who explained, commented and/or traced and classified the chains of narration within al-Adab al-Mufrad, most of the narrations within it were ruled to be authentic or at the least sound.

Contents 

Parents
Ties of Kinship
Mawlas
Looking After Girls
Looking After Children
Neighbours
Generosity and Orphans
Children Dying
Being a Master
Responsibility
Correctness
Dealing with people cheerfully
Consultation
Dealings with people and good character
Cursing and Defamation
Praising People
Visiting and Guests
The Elderly
Children
Mercy
Social Behaviour
Separation
Advice
Defamation
Extravagance in Building
Compassion
Attending to this world
Injustice
Illness and Visiting those who are ill
General Behaviour
Supplication
Guests and Spending
Speech
Names
Kunyas
Poetry
Words
General Behaviour
Omens
Sneezing and Yawning
Gestures
Greeting
Asking Permission to Enter
People of the Book
Letters and greetings
Gatherings
Humor
Sitting and lying down
Mornings and evenings
Sleeping and going to bed
Animals
Midday Naps
Circumcision
Betting and similar pastimes
Various
Aspects of Behavior
Anger

References

External links
 Al-Adab Al-Mufrad (partial) online at Sunnah.com

Religious texts
Hadith collections